Hypogeophis is a genus of caecilians in the family Grandisoniidae. The genus consists of four species, all endemic to parts of the Seychelles Archipelago.

Species
The genus has four recognized species:
 Hypogeophis brevis
 Hypogeophis montanus, Maddock, Wilkinson, and Gower, 2018
 Hypogeophis pti – petite Praslin caecilian, found on Praslin
 Hypogeophis rostratus – Frigate Island caecilian

References

External links
 
 

Indotyphlidae
Amphibian genera
Taxa named by Wilhelm Peters
Endemic fauna of Seychelles